Correa alba, commonly known as white correa, is a species of shrub that is endemic to south-eastern Australia. It has egg-shaped to more or less circular leaves, erect white flowers arranged singly or in groups on short side branches, and green fruit.

Description
The lower side of the leaves is densely covered with woolly hairs. The eight stamens are shorter than the petals.

Taxonomy
Correa alba was first formally described by Henry Cranke Andrews in 1798 in his book,The Botanist's Repository for New, and Rare Plants.

The Australian Plant Census accepts the names of two varieties:

Distribution and habitat
White correa occurs in South Australia, New South Wales, Victoria and Tasmania. In New South Wales it grows in sandy and rocky areas in near coastal areas south form Port Stephens. In Victoria it is common in coastal heath and woodland, extending to the far south east of South Australia. In Tasmania it is common on exposed rocky and sandy areas on the north and east coasts.

Variety alba occurs from Port Stephens and along the coasts of New South Wales and as far west as Cape Otway in Victoria. It is also the variety occurring in Tasmania. Variety pannosa is found along the south-west coast of Victoria and as far east as the Encounter Bay region of South Australia.

Ecology
Wombats have been known to eat the leaves and roots.

Uses

In horticulture
Correa alba is a hardy species in well-drained situations and withstands coastal exposure.  A position in full sun is best for flowering, but it can also be grown in part shade. It may be used to create an informal hedge or as a container plant.

In food
The 1889 book 'The Useful Native Plants of Australia records that common names included " Cape Barren Tea" in Tasmania, and that "The leaves of this plant have been used by the sealers on the islands in Bass's Straits as a substitute for tea."

References

alba
Flora of New South Wales
Flora of Tasmania
Flora of Victoria (Australia)
Plants described in 1798
Taxa named by Henry Cranke Andrews